Meg is a feminine given name. 

It may also refer to:

Entertainment
Meg, sci-fi franchise created by Steve Alten about megalodon sharks
Meg: A Novel of Deep Terror, a 1997 science fiction novel by Steve Alten
The Meg, a 2018 film based on the Steve Alten novel series
Meg 2: The Trench, an upcoming sequel to the 2018 film
Meg!, a comic strip

Other uses
 Meg (computer), an early British computer developed at Manchester University
 Meg (informal), short for megabyte, a computer term, or decimal unit of data
 Meg (informal), short for mebibyte, a computer term, or binary unit of data
 Meg (informal), short for Megalodon, an extinct shark

See also

 Mons Meg, a medieval bombard located at Edinburgh Castle, Scotland
 Megalodon (disambiguation)
 Mega (disambiguation)
 MEG (disambiguation)